Innsbruck Observatory (Universitäts-Sternwarte Innsbruck) is an astronomical observatory owned and operated by the institutes of astrophysics out of the University of Innsbruck.  It is located in Innsbruck, Austria.

See also
 List of astronomical observatories

References

External links
Innsbruck Observatory

Astronomical observatories in Austria
Buildings and structures in Innsbruck
Education in Tyrol (state)